Leslie Francis Hardiman (1 April 1911 – 29 June 1962) was an Australian rules footballer who played for the Geelong Football Club in the Victorian Football League (VFL) and for the Subiaco Football Club in the Western Australian National Football League (WANFL).

Hardiman was nicknamed 'Splinter' and was a key position player for Geelong. A premiership player with the club in 1931 and 1937, he also won their best and fairest award Theo Lewis Cup in 1933.

Early years and Playing Career
Hardiman was the third of seven children born to John Francis (Jack) Hardiman and Julia née Leary (1881—1963). Father Jack had played 21 games for Geelong and his eldest brother, Harold Peter, would also play for Geelong.

He represented Victoria 5 times in interstate football and was named on Geelong's interchange bench in their official 'Team of the Century'.

Initially named at full-forward, he was switched to centre half-back after quarter time to mind Magpie star Ron Todd, who had kicked three of Collingwood's six goals in the first quarter. He would restrict Todd to only one more goal for the rest of the game and be rated among Geelong's best players that day. Even better was that he shared the premiership success with his brother Peter, who was also counted among Geelong's best for his duel in the ruck with Albert Collier.

Hardiman told The West Australian that he had been advised by a Geelong official that there was every possibility of his securing a clearance if the club were satisfied that he had firmly established himself in Western Australia and had bettered his position in life. He also added that he intended to be married before he left Melbourne.

Hardiman added a further 69 league games over the next four seasons. In 1938 he played two games for his adopted state against South Australia, two years later he won the Maroons' 1940 fairest and best award and was also the leading goal scorer with 46 goals.

In February 1942, Hardiman, now living in Mount Lawley, enlisted for duty with the Australian Army and served with the 2/11th Infantry Battalion during World War 2. By the time he was discharged after the war had ended, in November 1945, he had risen to the rank of corporal.

In 1962, Hardiman was killed in a car accident.

In 1996 Les Hardiman was named on the interchange in the Geelong Football Club team the century.

References

Bibliography

External links

1911 births
1962 deaths
Australian Rules footballers: place kick exponents
Geelong Football Club players
Geelong Football Club Premiership players
Subiaco Football Club players
Yarraville Football Club players
Brunswick Football Club players
Chilwell Football Club players
Carji Greeves Medal winners
Road incident deaths in Victoria (Australia)
Australian Army personnel of World War II
Australian Army soldiers
Two-time VFL/AFL Premiership players
Australian rules footballers from Geelong